Beinn Mhic Chasgaig (864 m) is a mountain in the Grampian Mountains of Scotland. It lies near the head of Glen Etive in Highland.

A steep and craggy peak, it is surrounded by high Munros and provides a very steep and challenging climb to its summit. Climbs start from Glen Etive.

References

Mountains and hills of Highland (council area)
Marilyns of Scotland
Corbetts